The Speed Kings is a 1913 American short comedy film starring Mabel Normand and featuring Fatty Arbuckle in an early role. The film is set at a race track and features footage of actual races. The story has Mabel's papa trying to prevent her growing infatuation with real life racing driver Teddy Tetzlaff.

Cast
 Ford Sterling - Papa
 Mabel Normand - Mabel
 Teddy Tetzlaff - Himself - a race car driver
 Earl Cooper - Himself - a race car driver
 Roscoe 'Fatty' Arbuckle - Race track official
 Billy Jacobs - (as Paul Jacobs)
 Barney Oldfield - Himself - a race car driver

See also
 List of American films of 1913
 Fatty Arbuckle filmography

References

External links

1913 films
1913 comedy films
1910s sports comedy films
1913 short films
American silent short films
American auto racing films
American black-and-white films
Films directed by Wilfred Lucas
American sports comedy films
American comedy short films
1910s American films
Silent American comedy films
Silent sports comedy films